Buckland is a village and civil parish in the East Hertfordshire district of Hertfordshire, England. The village is situated on the A10 road, with the market town of Royston situated 4 miles north and Buntingford 3 miles south. According to the 2011 census, the parish of Buckland, including the hamlet of Chipping has a population of 274.

See also
St Andrew's Church, Buckland

References

External links

Villages in Hertfordshire
Civil parishes in Hertfordshire
East Hertfordshire District